The Ministry of Investment and Foreign Economic Relations (abbreviated MIFER) is a ministry of the Government of Myanmar. It was created by president Win Myint. The Myanmar Armed Forces appointed Aung Naing Oo as the Minister for Investment and Foreign Economic Relations on 1 February 2021.

History

During the 2018 ASEAN summit, State Counsellor Aung San Suu Kyi called on businesses to invest in Myanmar. She delivered a keynote speech, inviting foreign entities to invest in the country’s priority sectors (including agriculture, food processing, fisheries, export promotion, import substitution, energy, logistics, education, healthcare and construction), saying that investing in Myanmar will bring good returns to both investors and the nation.

Htun Htun Oo, Union Attorney General, made a proposal to the Pyidaungsu Hluttaw for the formation of a new ministry on 12 November 2018. As there was no disagreement, Pyidaungsu Hluttaw Speaker announced the establishment of the new ministry. It was formed by combining the Foreign Economic Relations Department, Directorate of Investment and Company Administration of the Ministry of Planning and Finance.

Due to the ministry's creation, the number of ministries in the cabinet rose to 25.

List of Union Ministers

References

External links

InvestmentandForeignEconomicRelations
Ministries established in 2018
2018 establishments in Myanmar